Alebrini is a leafhopper tribe in the subfamily Typhlocybinae.

Genera 

 Abrabra
 Abrela
 Afralebra
 Albera
 Alebra
 Aphanalebra
 Arbelana
 Asialebra
 Balera
 Barela
 Beamerulus
 Benglebra
 Brunerella
 Diceratalebra
 Elabra
 Erabla
 Habralebra
 Hadralebra
 Hussainiana
 Lareba
 Lawsonellus
 Omegalebra
 Orientalebra
 Orsalebra
 Osbornulus
 Paralebra
 Protalebra
 Protalebrella
 Rabela
 Relaba
 Rhabdotalebra
 Shaddai
 Sobrala
 Trypanalebra

References

External links 

 
Typhlocybinae
Hemiptera tribes